Articles on Sinpo include:

 Sinpo, South Hamgyong, North Korea
 Sinpo, North Hamgyong, North Korea
 Sinpo Station (Pyongra Line), North Korea
 Sinpo Station (Incheon), South Korea
 Sinpo-class submarine
 SINPO code, acronym for signal, interference, noise, propagation, and overall